The Group 4 racing class referred to regulations for cars in sportscar racing, GT racing and rallying, as regulated by the FIA. The Group 4 class was replaced by Group B for the 1983 season.

Production requirements
Prior to 1966, the FIA's Group 4 classification applied to Sports Cars which were in compliance with FIA Appendix C regulations. It also included recognised Series Touring Cars, Improved Touring Cars and Grand Touring Cars which had been modified beyond the respective Group 1, Group 2 or Group 3 regulations under which they had been homologated. In 1966, an overhaul of FIA categories saw Group 4 Sports Cars redefined such that they were now subject to a minimum production requirement of 50 units in 12 consecutive months and had to be fitted with all equipment necessary for use on public roads. A 5000cc engine capacity limit was applied for 1968 and the minimum production requirement was reduced to 25 units for the 1969 season.

For 1969, Appendix J of the FIA International Sporting Code defined groups for Touring cars, Grand Touring cars and Sports cars as follows: (numbers between brackets are required minimum production in 12 consecutive months).

 Group 1: series-production touring cars (5,000)
 Group 2: touring cars (1,000)
 Group 3: grand touring cars (500)
 Group 4: sports cars (25)
 Group 5: special touring cars
 Group 6: prototype-sports cars

For 1970, the limited production sports car category was renamed from Group 4 to Group 5 and, in the same year, Group 4 became the class for special grand touring cars with minimum production of 500 in 12 consecutive months 

For 1971, the relevant FIA classifications were as follows:
 Group 1: series-production touring cars (5,000)
 Group 2: touring cars (1,000)
 Group 3: series-production grand touring cars (1,000)
 Group 4: special grand touring cars (500)
 Group 5: sports cars (25)
 Group 6: prototype-sports cars

In 1976, the Group 4 production requirement was reduced to 400 in 24 months.

Sports car racing 

In 1966 and 1967 the Group 4 Sports Cars played a supporting role to the Group 6 prototypes. While prototypes like the 7.0L Ford GT40 Mk II and the Mk IV raced for outright victories, the 4.7L GT40 Mk I entries were competing for Group 4 class wins. Indeed, competitors in the two categories were competing for two different championships, the Group 6 cars for the International Championship for Sports-Prototypes and the Group 4 cars for the International Championship for Sports Cars.
In 1968, the rules were changed, so that prototypes were limited to 3.0L, but Sports cars of up to 5.0L could still be entered. It was also announced that the minimum production figure for the Group 4 sports cars would be reduced to 25 cars for 1969. With larger engines than the prototypes, the Group 4 cars were now in contention for outright race wins. The Ford GT40 was the winner at Le Mans in both 1968 and 1969. Porsche began work on a production run of 25 cars for the Porsche 917. Ferrari, with some financial help from Fiat, produced the similar Ferrari 512.

For the 1970 season, the Group 4 Sports car category was renamed and became Group 5 Sports Cars and Group 4 designation was applied to a new Special Grand Touring category. The new Group 4 was contested by production based cars such as the Ferrari 365 GTB/4 Daytona, Porsche 911 Carrera RS and the De Tomaso Pantera.

The Group 4 GT category was replaced by a new Group B GT class for 1983.

Rallying 

The Group 4 regulations were also used as the basis for the World Rally Championships until they were replaced by the Group B regulations. In mid 1970s to early 1980s rallying, it was necessary to produce 400 identical cars for homologation as a Group 4 rally car. Notable cars included the Ford Escort RS1800, Fiat 131 Abarth, Lancia Stratos HF and the Audi Quattro.

List of FIA Group 4 homologated cars

In addition, cars were homologated for Group 4 as variants of Group 3 cars. Before 1976, this was possible using a "100-off rule": clause bb of Art 260 of Appendix J to the FIA's International Sporting Code 1975 (invoked from Art 266). This rule only required production of 100 of a "bolt-on option kit" of parts, not the production of any modified cars as homologation specials, but was deleted after 1975 and approved components banned "Effective from the end of 1977". Such an approval applies to the Group 4 16-valve TR7, the multi-valve head (and other parts) from the Group 1 Dolomite Sprint being approved as "valid for Group 4" on 1 Oct. 1975 in amendment 1/1V to the Group 3 TR7 homologation papers and reapproved (following production of about 60 16-valve TR7 Sprints in 1977) on 1 Feb. 1978 in amendment 10/8v.

Groups 1-9

See also 
 World Sportscar Championship

References

External links
 FIA Historic Racing Regulations
 Historic Appendix J Regulations
 FIA 1969 Appendix J

Sports car racing
Rally groups
Fédération Internationale de l'Automobile
24 Hours of Le Mans
World Rally Championship